Aussie Rules the World is a 2014 Australian sports documentary film produced by Second Nature Films, directed by Michael Stringer McIntyre and includes interviews with various Australian Football League personalities, including, among others, former Sydney Swans premiership coach and later  coach Paul Roos, four-time  premiership coach and foundation  coach Kevin Sheedy, former AFL CEO Andrew Demetriou, current  player Bachar Houli and incumbent Australian of the Year Adam Goodes.

Filmed over a period of four years between 2011 and 2014, it focuses on the sport of Australian rules football and its efforts to spread the game worldwide. The film was released on 22 July 2014.

Background
Narrated by David Wenham, who starred as high-profile lawyer Julian McMahon in the 2013 television miniseries Better Man which looked into the real-life execution case of Van Tuong Nguyen, the film follows the journey of recently retired Sydney Swans premiership player Brett Kirk and his family, who embark on a six-month journey around the world to help spread the game across the globe, amid fears that the sport has been largely ignored in favour of other sports such as soccer, rugby union and rugby league.

The 2011 Australian Football International Cup is launched and it includes teams from a wide range of countries including Papua New Guinea, the United States, Ireland, New Zealand, India and South Africa, among many others.

Cast

See also
 Year of the Dogs
Kangaroo: A Love-Hate Story

References

External links
 Official website
 

2014 films
Documentary films about Australian rules football
2014 documentary films
2010s English-language films
Australian sports documentary films